Reverend Joseph Chotzner (May 11, 1844 – 1914) was the first rabbi of the Jewish community in Belfast, Ireland. He served from 1870–1880 at the helm of the Belfast Synagogue.

Biography
Chotzner was born at Cracow, Poland, May 11, 1844 and  educated at the Breslau rabbinical seminary and the University of Breslau. After his ordination Chotzner became the first rabbi of the congregation at Belfast, Ireland, officiating from 1870 to 1880; and he again held the rabbinate there from 1892 to 1897. He also taught (1880–92) at Harrow School. From 1897-1905 he was a lecturer at Montefiore College, Ramsgate, established by Moses Montefiore.

Chotzner wrote "Lel Shimmurim" (The Night of Observances), a poetry collection, Breslau, 1864; "Modern Judaism" (1876), "Humor and Irony of the Hebrew Bible," 1883; the memoirs "Zikronot" (1885); and "Hebrew Humour and Other Essays" (1915).

Alfred James Chotzner, Joseph's son, became a High Court Judge in Calcutta and a Member of Parliament in the UK.

See also
 History of the Jews in Northern Ireland

References

External links
 
 
 

1844 births
1914 deaths
19th-century British rabbis
20th-century British rabbis
Clergy from Belfast
Irish rabbis